The De Havilland Canada DHC-8, previously the Bombardier Dash 8, is a regional turboprop aircraft that was previously delivered in three size categories, typically seating from 37 passengers (DHC-8-100) to 90 passengers (DHC-8-400). Only the larger DHC-8-400 model remained in production until 2021. The following lists both former and current operators.

Unfilled orders
As of early 2021, De Havilland announced the suspension of production after a backlog of 19 aircraft had been completed. As of December 2018, the following customers had outstanding orders listed:

Civil operators 

A total of 143 Dash 8 Series 100 aircraft were in airline service with 35 operators as of July 2018.
A total of 42 Dash 8 Series 200 aircraft were in commercial service with 16 operators as of July 2018.
A total of 151 Dash 8 Series 300 aircraft were in airline service, with 32 operators as of July 2018.
A total of 508 DHC-8-400 aircraft are in airline service, with 56 orders as of July 2018.

Notes

:A.Two of the 100 series are listed as having their registration cancelled.
:B.One of the 200 series is listed as having an expired registration as of 2005.
:C.Regional 1 is owned by Avmax.

Former civil operators 

.

Remarks
 
 Air Wisconsin operating as United Express via a code sharing agreement with United Airlines
 Mesa Airlines operating as America West Express via a code sharing agreement with America West Airlines and later as US Airways Express via a code sharing agreement with US Airways and also as United Express via a code sharing agreement with United Airlines
 Colgan Air operating Q400 aircraft as Continental Connection via a code sharing agreement with Continental Airlines and later as United Express via a code sharing agreement with United Airlines
 CommutAir operating as Continental Express via code sharing agreement with Continental Airlines
 Freedom Airlines operating as the Delta Connection via a code sharing agreement with Delta Air Lines
 Henson Airlines operating as USAir Express via a code sharing agreement with USAir
 Island Air (Hawaii) (formerly operated DHC-8-100 aircraft that were subsequently removed from the fleet and now operates Q400 aircraft)
 Lynx Aviation operating code sharing flights with Q400 aircraft on behalf of Frontier Airlines
 Mesaba Airlines operating as Northwest Airlink via a code sharing agreement with Northwest Airlines
 Metro Airlines operating as Eastern Metro Express via a code sharing agreement with Eastern Airlines

Coast guard, border guard and military operators

Other applications 
Two used Q400s, acquired from Scandinavian Airlines System, were modified by Cascade Aerospace of Abbotsford, British Columbia for France's Sécurité Civile as fire-fighting water bombers in the fire season and as transport aircraft off season. The Q400 Airtanker can drop  of water in this role compared to Bombardier's CL-415 dedicated water bomber which can drop . The latter, however, is amphibious and requires less infrastructure.

The National Police of Colombia operates a single Bombardier Dash 8-300 for utility transport.

Neptune Aviation of Missoula, Montana have acquired a Q300 as a prototype for future Q200/Q300 water bombers to replace current P2V aircraft.

References

Dash 8
De Havilland Canada Dash 8
Bombardier Aerospace
Operators